Graphite is one of the allotropes of carbon.

Graphite may also refer to:
 Carbon fiber reinforced polymer
 Graphite (album), an album by Closterkeller
 Graphite Capital, a financial services company based in London
 Graphite, Ontario, a community in Canada
 Graphite (smart font technology), a font rendering system developed by SIL International
 Graphite (software), an open source monitoring tool
 Nuclear graphite, synthetic graphite used as a neutron moderator in nuclear reactors
 Graphite bomb, a weapon for disabling electrical power systems

See also
 Grafite (born 1979), Brazilian former footballer